Caladenia pluvialis, commonly known as the Yuna spider orchid, is a species of orchid endemic to the south-west of Western Australia. It is a common spider orchid, especially after winter rains, occurring in a restricted area. It has a single hairy leaf and one or two creamy-coloured flowers. It was formerly included with Caladenia incensa.

Description 
Caladenia pluvialis is a terrestrial, perennial, deciduous, herb with an underground tuber and which sometimes forms small clumps. The sepals and petals are linear to lance-shaped near their base then narrow to a reddish-black, thread-like glandular tip. Flowering occurs from August to early September and is encouraged by good winter rainfall.

Taxonomy and naming 
Caladenia pluvialis was first described in 2015 by Andrew Phillip Brown and Garry Brockman from a specimen collected near Mullewa and the description was published in Nuytsia. The specific epithet (pluvialis) is a Latin word meaning "of rain" referring to the importance of rain to the flowering of this species, which otherwise grows in a low-rainfall area.

Distribution and habitat 
The Yuna spider orchid occurs near Yuna and Mullewa in the Avon Wheatbelt and Geraldton Sandplains biogeographic regions.

Conservation
Caladenia pluvialis is classified as "Priority Two" by the Western Australian Government Department of Parks and Wildlife, meaning that it is poorly known and known from only one or a few locations.

References 

pluvialis
Orchids of Western Australia
Endemic orchids of Australia
Plants described in 2015
Endemic flora of Western Australia
Taxa named by Andrew Phillip Brown